Fred Burton (4 June 1918 – 24 July 1997) was an  Australian rules footballer who played with St Kilda in the Victorian Football League (VFL).

Notes

External links 

1918 births
1997 deaths
Australian rules footballers from South Australia
St Kilda Football Club players
West Torrens Football Club players
North Adelaide Football Club players